Paul Jans (born 5 August 1981) is a Dutch professional footballer who plays as a striker for De Treffers.

Career
Jans is a forward who was born in Veghel and made his debut in professional football, being part of the VVV-Venlo squad in the 2000–01 season.
In the 2006–2007 season he played on loan from NEC Nijmegen.

References

1981 births
Association football forwards
Living people
Expatriate footballers in Germany
Dutch expatriate footballers
Dutch footballers
VVV-Venlo players
NEC Nijmegen players
Eredivisie players
Eerste Divisie players
Rot-Weiss Essen players
F.C.V. Dender E.H. players
People from Veghel
De Treffers players
Footballers from North Brabant
Dutch expatriate sportspeople in Germany
Dutch expatriate sportspeople in Belgium
Expatriate footballers in Belgium